Chase was the debut album by jazz-rock fusion band Chase.

Bill Chase was already a well-established lead trumpet player when he decided to form his own band. He recruited three other veteran trumpet players and vocalist Terry Richards, backed them with a rock rhythm section, and created a band which merged both jazz and rock styles. The album was recorded in Chicago in November and early December 1970 and released in April 1971.

The single "Get It On" spent thirteen weeks on the Billboard Hot 100 chart starting in May 1971, eventually peaking at #24 in July of that year. This success drove album sales to more than 400,000 units - unusually high for a jazz artist. The album charted for a total of 26 weeks, peaking at #22. "Get It On" peaked at number #76 in Australia in 1971.

Release history
In addition the conventional 2 channel stereo version the album was also released by Epic in a 4 channel quadraphonic edition on LP on 8-track tape in 1972. The quad LP release was encoded with the SQ matrix system.

The stereo version of this album was re-released in Japan on CD in 1997. The album was reissued in the UK on the Super Audio CD format in 2018 by Dutton Vocalion. This release is a 2 albums on 1 disc compilation which also contains Chase's 1974 album Pure Music. The Dutton Vocalion disc contains the complete stereo and quad mixes of both albums.

Track listing
 "Open Up Wide" (Bill Chase) – 3:48
 "Livin' In Heat" (B. Hall / R. Turner / M. Walker) – 2:54
 "Hello Groceries" (D. O'Rourke) – 2:56
 "Handbags and Gladrags" (Mike d'Abo) – 3:23
 "Get It On" (B. Chase/Terry Richards) – 2:59
 "Boys and Girls Together" (Jim Peterik) – 2:56
 "Invitation to a River" – 14:13
 "Two Minds Meet" (L. Raub/B. Chase)
 "Stay" (L. Raub/B. Chase)
 "Paint It Sad" (L. Raub/B. Chase)
 "Reflections" (B. Chase)
 "River" (T. Richards/B. Chase)

Personnel
 Bill Chase - lead & solo trumpet
 Ted Piercefield - trumpet, lead vocal on "Handbags and Gladrags" and "Boys and Girls Together"
 Alan Ware - trumpet
 Jerry Van Blair - trumpet, lead vocal on "Hello Groceries"
 Phil Porter - keyboards
 Dennis Keith Johnson - bass guitar, vocals
 Angel South - guitar, vocals
 Jay Burrid - percussion
 Terry Richards - lead vocals except as noted above

Charts

Weekly charts

Year-end charts

References

1971 debut albums
Bill Chase albums
Epic Records albums